Juana Díaz barrio-pueblo  is a barrio and the administrative center (seat) of Juana Díaz, a municipality of Puerto Rico. Its population in 2010 was 3,977.

As was customary in Spain, in Puerto Rico, the municipality has a barrio called pueblo which contains a central plaza, the municipal buildings (city hall), and a Catholic church. Fiestas patronales (patron saint festivals) are held in the central plaza every year.

The central plaza and its church
The central plaza, or square, is a place in the barrio-pueblo for official and unofficial recreational events and a place where people can gather and socialize from dusk to dawn. The Laws of the Indies, Spanish law, which regulated life in Puerto Rico in the early 19th century, stated the plaza's purpose was for "the parties" (celebrations, festivities), and that the square should be proportionally large enough for the number of neighbors. These Spanish regulations also stated that the streets nearby should be comfortable portals for passersby, protecting them from the elements: sun and rain.

The historic church was built in 1807.

The , as the barrio-pueblo is still called, is divided into north, east, west and south sections.

Gallery

See also

 List of communities in Puerto Rico

References

Barrios of Juana Díaz, Puerto Rico